Alstonia is a widespread genus of evergreen trees and shrubs, of the family Apocynaceae. It was named by Robert Brown in 1811, after Charles Alston (1685–1760), professor of botany at Edinburgh from 1716 to 1760.

The type species Alstonia scholaris (L.) R.Br. was originally named Echites scholaris by Linnaeus in 1767.

Description
Alstonia consists of about 40–60 species (according to different authors) native to tropical and subtropical Africa, Central America, Southeast Asia, Polynesia and Australia, with most species in the Malesian region.

These trees can grow very large, such as Alstonia pneumatophora, recorded with a height of 60 m and a diameter of more than 2 m. Alstonia longifolia is the only species growing in Central America (mainly shrubs, but also trees 20 m high).

The leathery, sessile, simple leaves are elliptical, ovate, linear or lanceolate and wedge-shaped at the base. The leaf blade is dorsiventral, medium-sized to large and disposed oppositely or in a whorl and with entire margin. The leaf venation is pinnate, with numerous veins ending in a marginal vein. Phyllotaxy is whorled i.e. two or more leaves arises at a node and form a whorl .

The inflorescence is terminal or axillary, consisting of thyrsiform cymes or compound umbels. The small, more or less fragrant flowers are white, yellow, pink or green and funnel-shaped, growing on a pedicel and subtended by bracts. They consist of 5 petals and 5 sepals, arranged in four whorls. The fertile flowers are hermaphrodite. The gamosepalous green sepals consist of ovate lobes, and are distributed in one whorl. The annular disk is hypogynous. The five gamesepalous petals have oblong or ovate lobes and are disposed in one whorl. The corolla lobes overlapping to the left (such as A. rostrata) or to the right (such as A. macrophylla) in the bud. The ovary has 2 separate follicles with glabrous or ciliate, oblong seeds that develop into deep blue podlike, schizocarp fruit, between 7–40 cm long. The plants contain a milky latex, rich in poisonous alkaloids. Fijians use the latex of A. costata (saurua, sorua) as a form of chewing gum. The Alstonia macrophylla is commonly known in Sri Lanka as 'Havari nuga' or the 'wig banyan' because of its distinct flower that looks like a woman's long wig.

Alstonia trees are used in traditional medicine. The bark of the Alstonia constricta and the Alstonia scholaris is a source of a remedy against malaria, toothache, rheumatism and snake bites. The latex is used in treating coughs, throat sores and fever.

Many Alstonia species are harvested for timber, called pule or pulai in Indonesia and Malaysia. Trees from the section Alstonia produce lightweight timber, while those from the sections Monuraspermum and Dissuraspermum produce heavy timber.

Alstonia trees are widespread and mostly not endangered. However a few species are very rare, such as A. annamensis, A. beatricis, A. breviloba, A. stenophylla and A. guangxiensis.

Species
Alstonia has  five distinct sections, each a monophyletic group; Alstonia, Blaberopus, Tonduzia, Monuraspermum, Dissuraspermum.

Accepted species
 Alstonia actinophylla (A.Cunn.) K.Schum. – milkwood - New Guinea, N Australia
 Alstonia angustifolia A.DC. - Borneo, W Malaysia, Sumatra
 Alstonia angustiloba Miq. - Borneo, W Malaysia, Sumatra, Thailand, Java
 Alstonia annamensis (Monach.) K.Sidiyasa - Cambodia, Vietnam
 Alstonia balansae Guillaumin - New Caledonia
 Alstonia beatricis K.Sidiyasa - Waigeo I in E Indonesia
 Alstonia boonei De Wild. - W + C + E Africa
 Alstonia boulindaensis Boiteau - New Caledonia
 Alstonia breviloba K.Sidiyasa - Papua New Guinea
 Alstonia congensis Engl. - W + C Africa
 Alstonia constricta F.Muell. – bitterbark, quinine tree, Australian fever bark - E Australia
 Alstonia coriacea Pancher & S.Moore - New Caledonia
 Alstonia costata R.Br. - S Pacific
 Alstonia curtisii King & Gamble - Thailand
 Alstonia deplanchei Van Heurck & Müll.Arg. - New Caledonia
 Alstonia guangxiensis D.Fang & X.X.Chen - Guangxi in China
 Alstonia iwahigensis Elmer - Borneo, Palawan
 Alstonia lanceolata  Van Heurck & Müll.Arg. - New Caledonia
 Alstonia lanceolifera S.Moore - New Caledonia
 Alstonia legouixiae Van Heurck & Müll.Arg. - New Caledonia
 Alstonia lenormandii Van Heurck & Müll.Arg. - New Caledonia
 Alstonia longifolia (A.DC.) Pichon - Mexico, Central America
 Alstonia macrophylla Wall. ex G.Don – batino, devil tree - S China, Sri Lanka, SE Asia, New Guinea
 Alstonia mairei H. Léveillé - S China, N Vietnam
 Alstonia muelleriana Domin – jackapple, leatherjacket, milky yellowwood - New Guinea, Queensland
 Alstonia neriifolia D.Don - Nepal, Sikkim, Bhutan
 Alstonia odontophora Boiteau - New Caledonia
 Alstonia parkinsonii (M.Gangop. & Chakrab.) Lakra & Chakrab. - Andaman Is.
 Alstonia parvifolia Merr. - Philippines
 Alstonia penangiana K.Sidiyasa - Penang Hill in Malaysia
 Alstonia pneumatophora Backer ex L.G.Den Berger - W Malaysia, Borneo, Sulawesi, Sumatra 
 Alstonia quaternata Van Heurck & Müll.Arg. - New Caledonia
 Alstonia rostrata C.E.C.Fischer - Yunnan, Indochina, W Malaysia, Sumatra
 Alstonia rubiginosa K.Sidiyasa - Papua New Guinea
 Alstonia rupestris Kerr - Thailand
 Alstonia scholaris (L.) R.Br. – pali-mari, dita bark, bitter bark, milkwood, milky bean, milky pine, white cheesewood, scholar tree, blackboard tree - E + S + SE Asia, Papuasia, N Australia
 Alstonia sebusii (Van Heurck & Müll.Arg.) Monach. - Yunnan, Bhutan, Assam, N Myanmar
 Alstonia spatulata Blume – hard milkwood, Siamese balsa - SE Asia, New Guinea
 Alstonia spectabilis R.Br. – poele bark, jackapple, leatherjacket, milky yellowwood - SE Asia, Papuasia, N Australia
 Alstonia sphaerocapitata Boiteau - New Caledonia
 Alstonia venenata R.Br. - S India
 Alstonia vieillardii Van Heurck & Müll.Arg. - New Caledonia
 Alstonia vietnamensis D.J.Middleton - Vietnam
 Alstonia yunnanensis Diels - Yunnan, Guizhou, Guangxi

Gallery

Notes

References

   
 Kade Sidiyasa, A., 3, 1992. A monograph of Alstonia (Apocynaceae).
 

 
Apocynaceae genera
Taxa named by Robert Brown (botanist, born 1773)